Adolph (Adolf) Bachmeier (October 13, 1937 – July 21, 2016) was a U.S.-Romanian soccer player.  He spent most of his playing career with various teams in Chicago.  He also earned fifteen caps with the U.S. national team between 1959 and 1969.   He was inducted into the National Soccer Hall of Fame in 2002.

Professional career
Bachmeier was born in Romania but spent his playing career in Chicago.  He played as either a defender or defensive midfielder for the Chicago Kickers of the National Soccer League of Chicago beginning in the 1950s.  In 1965, Bachmeier was honored as the Sepp Herberger German-American Illinois soccer player of the year.  In 1966 and 1968, the Kickers won the National Amateur Cup.  In 1968, he joined the Chicago Mustangs of the North American Soccer League (NASL).  Bachmeier and the Mustangs spent only a single season in the NASL.  In 1969, he returned to the Kickers, winning the National Amateur Cup a third time with them in 1970.

National team
Bachmeier earned his first caps with the U.S. national team in a crushing 8–1 loss to England on May 28, 1959.  That was the only U.S. game in 1959 and Bachmeier was not called up for either of the U.S. games in 1960.  However, he returned to the lineup in 1961 for the only U.S. game that year, a loss to Colombia.  Once again, Bachmeier had a multi-year lay off from the national team.  His next appearance came in a March 7, 1965, tie with Mexico.  He earned two more caps that year, but the U.S. team was inactive in 1966 and 1967.  In 1968, Bachmeier finally became a regular, and team captain, on the national team as he earned eight of his caps that year.  The U.S. entered the qualification rounds for the 1970 FIFA World Cup that year.  He finished his national team career with two more caps in 1969, both loses to Haiti.  Those losses put the U.S. out of contention for the World Cup.

In addition to his games with the senior U.S. team, Bachmeier was also a member of the 1963 Pan American team which went 0–4 at those games.  In 1964, he was also part of the U.S. team which attempted, but failed, to qualify for the 1964 Summer Olympics.

He was inducted into the Illinois Soccer Hall of Fame in 1984, the National Soccer Hall of Fame in 2002 and the USASA Hall of Fame in 2007.

References

External links
 Soccer Hall of Fame profile
 Chicago Kickers profile – with photos
 
 FIFA: Adolph Bachmeier
 Obituary on Legacy.com

Interviews
 Din România, lângă Pele, 6 aprilie 2010, Evenimentul Zilei

1937 births
2016 deaths
People from Constanța County
American soccer players
American people of German-Romanian descent
United States men's international soccer players
Soccer players from Chicago
North American Soccer League (1968–1984) players
Chicago Mustangs (1967–68) players
National Soccer Hall of Fame members
Romanian emigrants to the United States
Footballers at the 1963 Pan American Games
Pan American Games competitors for the United States
Association football defenders
Association football midfielders